Hendron is a census-designated place (CDP) in McCracken County, Kentucky, United States. The population was 4,687 at the 2010 census, an increase from 4,239 in 2000. It is part of the Paducah, KY-IL Micropolitan Statistical Area.

Geography
Hendron is located at  (37.037800, -88.644889).

History
Hendron was named for the local Hendron family.

Demographics

As of the census of 2000, there were 4,239 people, 1,832 households, and 1,278 families residing in the CDP. The racial makeup of the CDP was 95.59% White, 2.24% African American, 0.26% Native American, 0.66% Asian, 0.42% from other races, and 0.83% from two or more races. Hispanic or Latino of any race were 1.25% of the population.

There were 1,832 households, out of which 28.5% had children under the age of 18 living with them, 56.6% were married couples living together, 9.4% had a female householder with no husband present, and 30.2% were non-families. 26.9% of all households were made up of individuals, and 9.6% had someone living alone who was 65 years of age or older. The average household size was 2.30 and the average family size was 2.76.

In the CDP, the population was spread out, with 21.5% under the age of 18, 7.7% from 18 to 24, 28.0% from 25 to 44, 26.6% from 45 to 64, and 16.2% who were 65 years of age or older. The median age was 41 years. For every 100 females, there were 91.3 males. For every 100 females age 18 and over, there were 87.1 males.

The median income for a household in the CDP was $40,858, and the median income for a family was $49,401. Males had a median income of $45,870 versus $24,884 for females. The per capita income for the CDP was $22,984. About 3.8% of families and 7.0% of the population were below the poverty line, including 9.6% of those under age 18 and 9.2% of those age 65 or over.

Education
McCracken County Public Schools (MCPS), the school district that serves all areas in McCracken County except for the City of Paducah, has its headquarters in Hendron.

References

Census-designated places in McCracken County, Kentucky
Census-designated places in Kentucky
Paducah micropolitan area